The Mar del Plata Open is a defunct Grand Prix affiliated men's tennis tournament played in 1981. It was held at the Patinódromo Municipal, Mar del Plata in Argentina and played on outdoor clay courts.

Results

Singles

Doubles

References

External links
 ATP results archive

Clay court tennis tournaments
Tennis tournaments in Argentina
Grand Prix tennis circuit
Sport in Mar del Plata
Defunct tennis tournaments in Argentina